Kowalewice  is a village in Gmina Miastko, Bytów County, Pomeranian Voivodeship, in northern Poland, on the border with West Pomeranian Voivodeship.

From 1975 to 1998 the village was in Słupsk Voivodeship. 

It has a population of 41.

Transport
Kowalewice lies along the national road .

References

Map of the Gmina Miastko

Kowalewice